Georgi Stoimenov (born 17 April 1952) is a Bulgarian boxer. He competed in the men's light heavyweight event at the 1976 Summer Olympics.

References

1952 births
Living people
Bulgarian male boxers
Olympic boxers of Bulgaria
Boxers at the 1976 Summer Olympics
Place of birth missing (living people)
Light-heavyweight boxers